Bellavia is a surname. Notable people with the surname include:

David Bellavia (born 1975), American veteran and politician
Diego Alfredo Molero Bellavia, Venezuelan public official
Marcantonio Bellavia (fl. 1670), Sicilian painter and etcher
Michael Bellavia, American digital marketing executive
Timothy D. Bellavia (born 1971), American children's author, illustrator and educator

Notable people with Bellavia as their first name:
Bell Ribeiro-Addy (born 1985), British politician